This list comprises and encompasses people, both contemporary and historical, who are or were professionally or otherwise notably involved in occult practices. People who were or are merely believers of occult practices should not be included unless they played a leading or otherwise significant part in the practice of occultism.

Antiquity
People professionally or notably involved in occultism prior to the Middle ages

 Abaris the Hyperborean, a legendary sage, healer, and priest of Apollo
 Alexander of Abonoteichus, founder of glycon-worship and oracle
 Apollonius of Tyana, philosopher. 
 Apuleius, author of a magical novel
 Apsethus the Libyan, magician who attempted to prove he was divine
 Atomus, magus who worked for Antonius Felix at Caesarea 
 Chu Fu (d. 130), Chinese professional witch
 Elymas, Jewish magus who opposed Paul on Cyprus
 Empedocles philosopher
 Gyges of Lydia, king said to possess magical artifacts
 Hermes Trismegistus/Thoth, legendary magician and a god
 Iamblichus, neo-platonist philosopher, espoused theurgy 
 Iannes and Mambres, magicians at Pharaoh's court mentioned in the New Testament
 Julian, theurgist 
 Mary the Jewess, 4th century alchemist
 Parmenides philosopher
 Plato, philosopher
 Pythagoras, Greek mathematician, numerologist, philosopher important in occultism
 Ptolemy, astrologer
 Queen of Sheba, Ethiopian witch
 Simon Magus, magician mentioned in New Testament of the Christian Bible.
 Solomon, reputed creator of the Seal of Solomon and supposed author of the Testament of Solomon, Key of Solomon, Magical Treatise of Solomon and the Lesser Key of Solomon
 St Cyprian of Antioch, 4th century sorcerer
 Virgil, subjected to magical legends
 Vyasa, author and character of Mahabharat
 The Witch of Endor, witch and spirit medium of King Saul in the Old Testament
 Zhang Jiao, leader of the Yellow Turban Rebellion, founder of a Taoist sect of faith healers
 Zhuge Liang, advisor to Liu Bei during the Three Kingdoms period
 Zoroaster, founder of the order of the Magi
 Zosimos of Panopolis, Egyptian alchemist and gnostic mystic

Middle Ages
People professionally or notably involved in occultism during the Middle ages (circa 500–1500)

 Abe no Seimei (921–1005), Japanese painter and alleged mage.
 Abraham Abulafia (1240–1291), kabbalist "messiah"
 Abramelin the Mage (c. 1362–1458), Egyptian sage
 Roger Bolingbroke (d. 1441), astrologer and alleged necromancer 
 Albertus Magnus (1200–1280), had many magical texts attributed to him
Marsilio Ficino (1433–1499), astrologer and translator of the "Corpus Hermeticum"
 Gerald FitzGerald, 3rd Earl of Desmond (1335–1398), alleged associate with the goddess Áine 
 Gerald FitzGerald, 8th Earl of Kildare (1457–1513), rumored to be a shapeshifter skilled in the black arts
 Gerald FitzGerald, 11th Earl of Kildare (1525–1585), rumored to be an alchemist with magical powers
 Gilles de Rais (1405-1440), serial killer accused of sorcery
 Jābir ibn Hayyān (9th-century), Persian-Arab alchemist that influenced all Medieval alchemy
 Joachim of Fiore (1135–1202), Christian esotericist who founded his own group called the Joachimites
 John of Nottingham (14th-century) and Robert Marshall (14th-century), accused of attempting to kill Edward II with magic
 Nicolas Flamel (1330–1418), considered one of Europe's greatest alchemists, rumored to have learned the secrets of the philosopher's stone and an elixir of life, which granted him wealth and immortality.
 Pietro d'Abano (1257–1316) astrologer and purported author of the Heptameron, a grimoire
 Ramon Llull (1232–1316), syncretic mystic
 Roger Bacon (1220–1292), philosopher accused of magic
 Michael Scot (c. 1172–1220), magician
 Ímar Ua Donnubáin (13th-century), Norse-Gaelic navigator and sorcerer

16th century
People professionally or notably involved in occultism during the 16th-century

 Heinrich Cornelius Agrippa (1486–1535), occult philosopher, astrologer
 Giordano Bruno (1548–1600), occult philosopher
 Benevenuto Cellini (1500–1571), sculptor whose diary relates experience summoning spirits
 Cosimo Ruggeri (fl. 1571–1615), Italian astrologer and occultist
 John Dee (1527–1608), occult philosopher, mathematician, alchemist, queen Elizabeth's advisor
 Gerhard Dorn (1530–1584), Belgian follower of Paracelsus
 Edward Kelley (1555–1597), spirit medium and alchemist who worked with John Dee, founder of Enochian magic
 John Lambe (1545–1628), astrologer to George Villiers, 1st Duke of Buckingham
 Nostradamus (1503–1566), one of the world's most famous prophets
 Paracelsus (1493–1541), medical pioneer and occult philosopher
 Henry Percy (1563-1632), "Wizard Earl"
 Giovanni Pico della Mirandola (1463–1494), humanist and neoplatonist
 Sir Walter Raleigh (1552–1618), practiced alchemy
 Johannes Reuchlin (1545–1622), German cabalist magician, summoned angels
 Rudolph II, Holy Roman Emperor (1552–1612), patron of alchemists
 Ursula Southeil (1488–1561), English soothsayer and prophet
 Krishnananda Agamavagisha (fl. 1575), tantric guru and scholar from Bengal
 Soulmother of Küssnacht (d. 1577), Swiss medium
 Johannes Trithemius (1462–1516), cryptographer and magical writer
 Johann Weyer (aka Johannes Wierus) (1515–1588), German physician, occultist and demonologist

17th century 
People professionally or notably involved in occultism during the 17th-century

 Gironima Spana (1615–1659), Italian astrologer 
 Elias Ashmole (1617–1692), the first known speculative Freemason
 Olaus Borrichius (1626–1690), Danish alchemist 
 Thomas Browne (1605–1682), hermetic philosopher 
 Arthur Dee (1575–1661), hermetic author, son of John Dee 
 Robert Fludd (1574–1637), occult philosopher and astrologer 
 Isobel Gowdie (d. 1662), self-confessed professional sorcerer 
 Sir Isaac Newton (1642–1726), renowned physicist and alchemist
 Ali Puli (17th-century), anonymous author of seventeenth-century alchemical and hermetic texts 
 La Voisin (1640–1680), French professional magician

18th century 
People professionally or notably involved in occultism during the Age of Enlightenment (18th-century)

 Ulrica Arfvidsson (1734–1801), politically influential Swedish fortune-teller
 Gustaf Björnram (1746–1804), Swedish spiritual medium
 Alessandro Cagliostro (1743–1795), Italian occultist
 Clotilde-Suzanne Courcelles de Labrousse (1747–1821), French prophet medium
 Antoine Court de Gebelin (1725–1784), connected tarot and esotericism
 Etteilla (1738–1791), fortune-teller
 Marie Kingué (fl. 1785) African kaperlata occultist and faith healer
 Marie-Anne de La Ville (1680–1725) French occultist 
 Henrietta Lullier (1716–1782), French fortune teller
 Marquis de Sade (1740–1814), writer and libertine
 Count of St. Germain (dl. 1784), alchemist and occultist
 Höffern (fl. 1722), German-Swedish fortune teller
 Franz Mesmer (1734–1815) German magnetist
 August Nordenskiold (1754–1792), alchemist and Swedenborgian
 Charlotta Roos (1771–1809), Swedish spiritual medium
 Louis-Claude de Saint-Martin (1743–1803), founder of Martinism, writer known as the Unknown Philosopher
 Emanuel Swedenborg (1688–1772), alchemist, founder of Swedenborgianism
 Henrik Gustaf Ulfvenklou (1756–1819), Swedish spiritual medium

19th century 
People professionally or notably involved in occultism during the 19th-century

 Albert Pike (1809–1891), author and 33rd degree Freemason
 Evangeline Adams (1868–1932), astrologer to the famous
 Francis Barrett (c. 1770 – fl. 1802), wrote The Magus, a book about magic
 Alexis-Vincent-Charles Berbiguier de Terre-Neuve du Thym (1765-1851), French demonologist
 Algernon Blackwood (1869–1951), member of the Hermetic Order of the Golden Dawn
 Helena Petrovna Blavatsky (1831–1891), founder of Theosophy
 Mary Emily Bates Coues (1835-1906), secretary, Woman's National Liberal Union
 Robert Felkin (1853–1926), medical missionary and explorer, member of Hermetic Order of the Golden Dawn and Stella Matutina, author on Africa and medicine
 A. Frank Glahn (1865–1941), German mystic
 Stanislas de Guaita (1861–1899), occult author
 John George Hohman (fl. 1802–1846), American wizard
 Allan Kardec (1804–1869), founder of Spiritism
 Giuliano Kremmerz (1861–1930) alchemist and occult author
 Marie Laveau (1801–1881), American New Orleans Voodoo practitioner
 Marie Anne Lenormand (1772–1843), French fortune-teller favoured by Joséphine de Beauharnais
 Eliphas Lévi (1810–1875), French occult author and ceremonial magician
 Guido von List (1848–1919), Austrian writer and mystic
 Arthur Machen (1863–1947), member of the Hermetic Order of the Golden Dawn
 Moina Mathers (1865–1928), first initiate in Hermetic Order of the Golden Dawn, wife of S.L. MacGregor Mathers, and Imperatrix of the Alpha et Omega
 Samuel L. MacGregor Mathers (1854–1918), founder of the Hermetic Order of the Golden Dawn
 Papus, pseudonym for Gérard Encausse (1865–1916), occult author
 Jacques Collin de Plancy (1793–1871), French occultist, demonologist and writer 
 Paschal Beverly Randolph (1825–1875), African American physician and sex magician
 Grigori Rasputin (1869–1916), Russian mystic and healer
 Carl Reichenbach (1788–1869), German Occultist
 Theodor Reuss (1855–1923), German mason
 Arthur Rimbaud (1854–1891), visionary poet, adventurer
 August Strindberg (1849–1912), dramatist, alchemist
 Max Théon (1848-1927), occultist, Kabbalist, founder of the Cosmic Movement 
 Arthur Edward Waite (1857–1941), occult author and member of Hermetic Order of the Golden Dawn
 William Wynn Westcott (1848–1925), cofounder of the Hermetic Order of the Golden Dawn
 Karl Maria Wiligut (1866–1946), Austrian occultist 
 William Butler Yeats (1865–1934), poet, astrologer, member of the Hermetic Order of the Golden Dawn
 Charles Webster Leadbeater (1854–1934), occult books author and influential member of the Theosophical Society Adyar 
 Annie Besant (1847–1933), British writer, socialist and occultist 
 Pierre Bernard (yogi) (1875–1955), American occultist, businessman and yogi popularly known as "Oom The Omnipotent" 
 Damodar K. Mavalankar (1857–1885), Indian Theosophist

20th century 
People professionally or notably involved in occultism during the 20th century

 Margot Adler (1946—2014), witch and National Public Radio reporter
 Mirra Alfassa (1878—1971), Indian poet and mystic
 Robert Ambelain (1907—1997), French author of Masonic and astrological works
 Kenneth Anger (born 1927), filmmaker, author, and disciple of Crowley
 Dolores Ashcroft-Nowicki (born 1929), occultist, occult author, teacher
 Alice Bailey (1880—1949), English writer, mystic and Theosophist
 Franz Bardon (1909—1958), occult author, magician
 Christian Bernard (born 1951), former grandmaster and imperator of the mystical organization called Ancient Mystical Order Rosae Crucis (AMORC) 
 Michael Bertiaux (born 1935), author of the Voudon Gnostic Workbook, occult artist
 William Breeze (born 1955), author, musician, patriarch of Ecclesia Gnostica Catholica, and caliph of Ordo Templi Orientis. Also known as Hymenaeus Beta.
 Kerry Bolton (born 1956), New Zealand neo-Nazi activist and writer
 David Bowie (1947—2016), musician and actor
 Ray Buckland (1934—2017), author, teacher
 William S. Burroughs (1914—1997), author, Beat writer
 W. E. Butler (1898—1978), esoteric author
 Laurie Cabot (born 1933), witch, high priestess, author
 D. J. Conway (1939—2019), occult author
 Marjorie Cameron (1922—1995), scarlet woman of Jack Parsons' rituals, artist, actress
 Peter J. Carroll (born 1953), occultist, author, founder of Chaos magic
 Carlos Castaneda (unknown—1998), sorcerer, writer, anthropologist
 Jean Chevalier (1906—1993), occult author, philosopher, theologian
 Constant Chevillon (1880—1944), head of FUDOFSI
 Gurumayi Chidvilasananda (born 1955), Indian mystic and yogi who (as of 2017) is the spiritual head of Siddha Yoga
 Robert Collier (1885—1950), occult author.
 Pamela Colman Smith (1878—1951), artist, designed the Rider–Waite tarot deck, member of the Hermetic order of the Golden Dawn
 Aleister Crowley (1875—1947), English occultist and ceremonial magician, founder of Thelema religion
 Jinx Dawson (born 1950), ceremonial magician, artist, founder of rock band Coven (band), recording artist
 Samson De Brier (1899—1995), actor and occultist
 Maya Deren (1917—1961), filmmaker and Haitian Vodou priestess
 Savitri Devi (1905—1982), Greco-French Hindu writer, Nazi spy and leading figure of Esoteric Nazism
 Hilda Doolittle (1886—1961), American modernist poet, known under the pseudonym H.D.
 Aleksandr Dugin (born 1962), Russian philosopher, geopolitical analyst and political strategist, commonly referred to as "Putin's brain"
 Gerina Dunwich (born 1959), witch and occult author
 Lon Milo DuQuette (born 1948) musician, lecturer, and occultist
 Julius Evola (1898—1974), Italian philosopher
 Stewart Farrar (1916—2000), Alexandrian Wiccan, journalist, author
 Paul Foster Case (1884—1954), founder of BOTA, adept of the Western mystery tradition, teacher, occult author 
 Dion Fortune (1890—1946), considered one of Great Britain's most famous occultists, founder of the Fraternity of the Inner Light
 Fulcanelli, French alchemist and esoteric author
 Henri Gamache (fl. 1940s), authority on the Evil Eye
 Gerald Gardner (1890—1946), author and founder of the religion of Wicca
 Mort Garson (1924—2008), esoteric electronic music composer
 H. R. Giger (1940—2014), artist, designer, member of the Ordo Templi Orientis
 Sallie Ann Glassman (born 1954), practitioner of Haitian Vodou
 Rudolf John Gorsleben (1883—1930)
 Kenneth Grant (1924—2011), occultist, author, pupil of Alister Crowley
 John Michael Greer (born 1962), occult author, fantasist, blogger
 Eugen Grosche (1888—1964), known as Gregor A. Gregorius, German occultist, author, founder of the lodge Fraternitas Saturni
 Manly Palmer Hall (1901—1990), occult author, teacher 
 Frieda Harris (1877—1962), occultist, artist, painted the Thoth tarot deck
 Max Heindel (1865—1919), author
 Rudolf Hess (1894—1987), nazi interested in magic and the occult
 Heinrich Himmler (1900—1945), nazi Reichsführer SS, also interested in magic
 Phil Hine (fl. 1980s), occult author
 Murry Hope (1929—2012), occult author
 Christopher Hyatt (1943—2008), author, teacher, publisher
 Bola Ige (1930—2001), Nigerian lawyer and former minister of power who was a Rosicrucian.
 Guru Maharaj ji, Nigerian grand master occultist, self proclaimed living perfect master and god
 Alejandro Jodorowsky (born 1929), filmmaker, comic book writer, author and teacher on 'Psychemagia'
 Jiddu Krishnamurti (1895—1986), Indian occultist and philosopher, who was declared by the Theosophical Society Adyar as the incarnation of Jesus Christ and Krishna, and was destined to be a world teacher. 
 Siegfried Adolf Kummer (1899—1977), German occultist
 Kurt E. Koch (1913—1987), Christian missionary pastor, demonologist
 Konstantinos (born 1972), American occultist and writer 
 Nina Kulagina (1926—1990), Russian psychic; academic studies of her psychokinesis were widely disputed
 Dora van Gelder Kunz (1904—1999), occult author
 Roger de Lafforest (1905—1998), occult author
 Anton LaVey (1930—1997), occult author, founder of the Church of Satan
 Timothy Leary (1920—1996), psychologist, member of the Illuminates of Thanateros
 Sybil Leek (1917—1982), witch and occult author
 Harvey Spencer Lewis (1883—1939), founder of AMORC
 Ralph Maxwell Lewis (1904—1987), former imperator of AMORC
 Jörg Lanz von Liebenfels (1874—1954), Austrian occultist and pioneer of Ariosophy
 James H. Madole (1927—1979), American neo-Nazi, founder of the National Renaissance Party and personal friend of Anton LaVey
 Friedrich Bernhard Marby (1882—1966), German rune occultist
 Martinus Thomsen (1890—1981), Danish occultist
 Alan Moore (born 1953), British writer and occultist
 Evan Morgan (1893—1949), poet and aristocrat Lord Tredegar
 Grant Morrison (born 1960), comic writer and magician
 Jim Morrison (1943—1971), musician, occultist, member of rock band The Doors
 David Myatt (born 1950), allegedly the leader of the Order of Nine Angles
 Erwin Neutzsky-Wulff (born 1949), occultist, science fiction writer
 Eddie Nawgu (1957—2000), Nigerian sorcerer and self-proclaimed prophet of the Biblical God
 Rosaleen Norton (1917—1979), self-proclaimed Australian witch 
 Pericoma Okoye (born 1948), Nigerian spiritualist and musician
 Olumba Olumba, Nigerian self proclaimed God in human form who has been described as an occult grandmaster
 Jesu Oyingbo (—1988), Nigerian traditionalist & spiritualist who proclaimed himself to be Jesus Christ
 Tommaso Palamidessi (1915—1983), Christian occultist, founder of the Archeosophical Society
 Jimmy Page (born 1944), musician, occultist, member of rock band Led Zeppelin
 Jack Parsons (1914—1952), occultist, author, and rocket scientist
 Professor Peller (1941—1997), prominent Nigerian magician
 Genesis P-Orridge (1950—2020), of Psychic TV video group and TOPY, chaos magician
 Mark L. Prophet (1918—1973), founder of the Summit Lighthouse and proponet of the "I AM" movement who supposedly achieved unification with God and became an 'Ascended Master'
 Israel Regardie (1907—1985), occult author, magician, pupil of Aleister Crowley
 Jane Roberts (1929—1984), author
 Alex Sanders (1926—1988), founder of Alexandrian Wicca
 Miguel Serrano (1917—2009), Chilean diplomat, author of books on Esoteric Nazism
 Pekka Siitoin (1944—2003), Finnish occultist and neo-Nazi
 Robin Skelton (1925—1997), British-Canadian Wiccan and poet
 Harry Everett Smith (1923—1991), visual artist, experimental filmmaker, record collector, bohemian, mystic, largely self-taught student of anthropology, and Neo-Gnostic bishop
 Lionel Snell, occult author, known as Ramsey Dukes
 Austin Osman Spare (1886—1956), author, painter, magician
 Ludwig Straniak (1879—1951)
 Stephen Skinner (born 1948), Australian author
 Miriam Simos (born 1951), known under the pseudonym Starhawk, a witch and occult author
 Rudolf Steiner (1861—1925), founder of anthroposophy
 Gerald Suster (1951—2001), occult author
 Ralph Tegtmeier (born 1952), known as Frater U∴D∴, occultist, author, founder of Pragmatic Magic, Cyber Magic and Ice Magic
 Howard Thurston (1869—1936), American magician
 Paul Twitchell (1908 or 1909—1971), founder of the Eckankar religion and student of oriental occultism
 Mellie Uyldert (1908—2009), occult author
 Doreen Valiente (1922—1999), priestess and author
 Hannes Vanaküla (born 1966), mage
 Leila Waddell (1880—1932), mystic and muse
 Don Webb (born 1960), author of occult books and former high priest of Temple of Set 
 Samael Aun Weor (1917—1977), theurgist and founder of a 'Gnostic movement'.
 Robert Anton Wilson (1932—2007), author
 Catherine Yronwode (born 1947), occult author 
 Iyke Nathan Uzorma, Nigeria's first documented and self-proclaimed occult grand master 
 Swami Vivekananda (1863—1902), Indian mystic who supposedly possessed all occult powers known and also was a chief disciple of Ramakrishna. 
 Nirmala Srivastava (1923—2011), Indian mystic and occultist
 Francis Parker Yockey (1917—1960), American neo-fascist lawyer and author

21st century 
People professionally or notably involved in occultism during the 21st century;
 Margot Adler (1946—2014), American author, journalist, lecturer, Wiccan priestess
 Blanche Barton (born 1961), American religious leader who holds the title 'Magistra Templi Rex' within the Church of Satan
 Jean-Louis de Biasi (born 1959), author, lecturer, and spiritual teacher
 Damien Echols (born 1974), American occultist and author
 Lucien Greaves (born 2016) co-founder (alongside Malcolm Jarry) of The Satanic Temple.
 Augustus Sol Invictus (born 1983), American far-right attorney, expelled Ordo Templi Orientis member and former U.S. Senate candidate from Florida
 Thomas Karlsson (born 1972), Swedish occultist and esoteric author
 Konstantinos (born 1972), practicing occultist and neo-pagan
 Jon Nödtveidt (1975—2006), Swedish musician, member of Temple of the Black Light, committed suicide
 Stephen Skinner (born 1948), Australian author, editor, publisher and lecturer
 Julie Scott (born 1958), AMORC grandmaster.
 Catherine Yronwode (born 1947), American writer, graphic designer, and practitioner of folk magic
 Kate West (born 1957), British author and Wiccan priestess

See also
 List of alchemists
 List of astrologers
 List of occult writers
 List of spirituality-related topics
 Magical organization

References 

Occultists